Pedro Manuel Miguel Matías (born 11 October 1973) is a Spanish retired footballer who played as an attacking midfielder.

He spent the vast majority of his professional career in England, representing six teams, mainly Walsall for which he appeared in 162 competitive matches and scored 27 goals.

Club career
Born in Madrid, Matías was an unsuccessful Real Madrid youth graduate, only playing for its reserves for three seasons, two of those in Segunda División. In 1996–97 he was released and stayed in that level, appearing regularly and being relegated with UD Almería.

After a couple of months with CD Logroñés, also in the second tier, Matías left his homeland, going on to spend the following decade in the English Football League with six teams: Macclesfield Town, Tranmere Rovers, Walsall – by far his biggest spell with any club in the country, five seasons – Blackpool (where he scored once against Brighton), Bristol Rovers and Kidderminster Harriers (netting against Grimsby). On 24 March 2001, whilst playing for the Saddlers, he scored a hat-trick in a 5–1 home win over Wycombe Wanderers, being crucial to the club's promotion; the following campaign he also figured prominently as Walsall finished 18th and out of the relegation zone, notably scoring twice in a 3–2 home defeat of Rotherham United.

In 2005, at nearly 32, citing personal reasons, Matías returned to Spain and signed with lowly Gimnástica Segoviana CF of Tercera División, helping the Castile and León side win their group albeit without a final playoff promotion. Subsequently, he saw out the remainder of his career in amateur football.

Honours
Walsall
Football League Second Division: Play-off winner 2001

References

External links

1973 births
Living people
Footballers from Madrid
Spanish footballers
Association football midfielders
Segunda División players
Segunda División B players
Tercera División players
Real Madrid C footballers
Real Madrid Castilla footballers
UD Almería players
CD Logroñés footballers
English Football League players
Macclesfield Town F.C. players
Tranmere Rovers F.C. players
Walsall F.C. players
Blackpool F.C. players
Bristol Rovers F.C. players
Kidderminster Harriers F.C. players
Spain under-21 international footballers
Spanish expatriate footballers
Expatriate footballers in England
Spanish expatriate sportspeople in England